Clube Atlético Cerrado, commonly known as Sparta, is a Brazilian football club based in Paraíso do Tocantins, Tocantins state.

Stadium
Atlético Cerrado play their home games at Pereirão. The stadium has a maximum capacity of 2,300 people.

Honours
Campeonato Tocantinense (Second Division): 1 (2018)

References

Association football clubs established in 2006
Atlético Cerrado
2006 establishments in Brazil